Pierre-Hugues Herbert and Nicolas Mahut were the defending champions, but lost in the semifinals to Jamie Murray and Bruno Soares.

Murray and Soares went on to win the title, defeating Pablo Carreño Busta and Guillermo García-López in the final, 6–2, 6–3.

Seeds

Draw

Finals

Top half

Section 1

Section 2

Bottom half

Section 3

Section 4

Other entry information

Wild cards

Protected ranking

Alternates
  Colin Fleming /  Mariusz Fyrstenberg

Notes

External links
 Men's Doubles Main Draw
2016 US Open – Men's draws and results at the International Tennis Federation

Men's Doubles

US Open (tennis) by year – Men's doubles